Simple file verification (SFV) is a file format for storing CRC32 checksums of files to verify the integrity of files. SFV is used to verify that a file has not been corrupted, but it does not otherwise verify the file's authenticity. The  file extension is usually used for SFV files.

Checksum 
Files can become corrupted for a variety of reasons, including faulty storage media, errors in transmission, write errors during copying or moving, and software bugs.  SFV verification ensures that a file has not been corrupted by comparing the file's CRC hash value to a previously calculated value.  Due to the nature of hash functions, hash collisions may result in false positives, but the likelihood of collisions is usually negligible with random corruption. (The number of possible checksums is limited though large, so that with any checksum scheme many files will have the same checksum. However, the probability of a corrupted file having the same checksum as its original is exceedingly small, unless deliberately constructed to maintain the checksum.)

SFV cannot be used to verify the authenticity of files, as CRC32 is not a collision resistant hash function; even if the hash sum file is not tampered with, it is computationally trivial for an attacker to cause deliberate hash collisions, meaning that a malicious change in the file is not detected by a hash comparison. In cryptography, this attack is called a collision attack. For this reason, the md5sum and sha1sum utilities are often preferred in Unix operating systems, which use the MD5 and SHA-1 cryptographic hash functions respectively.

Even a single-bit error causes both SFV's CRC and md5sum's cryptographic hash to fail, requiring the entire file to be re-fetched.
The Parchive and rsync utilities are often preferred for verifying that a file has not been accidentally corrupted in transmission, since they can correct common small errors with a much shorter download.

Despite the weaknesses of the SFV format, it is popular due to the relatively small amount of time taken by SFV utilities to calculate the CRC32 checksums when compared to the time taken to calculate cryptographic hashes such as MD5 or SHA-1.

SFV uses a plain text file containing one line for each file and its checksum in the format FILENAME<whitespaces>CHECKSUM.  Any line starting with a semicolon ';' is considered to be a comment and is ignored for the purposes of file verification. The delimiter between the filename and checksum is always one or several spaces; tabs are never used. A sample SFV file is:

 ; This is a comment
 file_one.zip   c45ad668
 file_two.zip   7903b8e6
 file_three.zip e99a65fb

Command-line utility 
An example of an open-source cross-platform command-line utility that outputs crc32 checksums is 7-Zip.

See also 
 Cyclic redundancy check (CRC)
 File verification
 Parchive

References

Further reading 
 "SFV FAQ ( from isonews.com )", SourceForge, retrieved and archived 29 August 2021.

External links 
 Online SFV Calculator
 QuickSFV SFV checksum verifier (Windows Vista or earlier and Linux)
 wxChecksums- Opensource Windows/Linux application
 Check SFV - SFV software for UNIX systems
 checkSum+, Mac OS X, MD5 compatible, free
 isfv sfv checksum verifier for Mac OS X

Windows only
 RapidCRC- Freeware application
 RekSFV - SFV, MD5, SHA1 utility  (Multi-Language, Unicode, with batch mode for checking a huge amount of folders)
 RapidCRC Unicode- RapidCRC with Unicode support (v0.3.4 as of 05/27/2012 supports UTF-8 with or without BOM and UTF-16 LE)
 AmoK SFV Utility - CRC32 and MD5 Compatible
 SFV Ninja - SFV, MD5, SHA-1/256/384/512 utility (Freeware for personal use)
 SFV Checker
 SFVManager
 SlavaSoft FSUM - Fast File Integrity Checker
 HashCheck Shell Extension - SFV, MD4, MD5, SHA-1 (Multi-Language)
 Total Commander - supports creation and verification of SFV files
 hkSFV - supports creation and verification of SFV files (crashes on massive SFV files check)
 DySFV - Open Source (free) application for large files
 ilSFV - free and open-source SFV, MD5 and SHA-1 file verification utility.
Computer file formats
Checksum algorithms